The 4000-series PCC was a streetcar used by the Port Authority of Allegheny County. The PCC streetcar was designed by the Presidents' Conference Committee, a group of transit operators in the United States and Canada. The 4000's were a series of cars completely rebuilt from cars built in 1949 by the St. Louis Car Company for Port Authority's predecessor, Pittsburgh Railways.

Background

In the early 1980s, the Pittsburgh Port Authority began its "Stage I" project to completely rebuild portions of its streetcar system into their new T system.  This project consisted of a reconstructed Beechview-South Hills Village line supplemented by an order of 55 Siemens SD-400 light rail cars.  However, this project would only reconstruct roughly fifty-five percent of the existing system, with the Overbrook-Library and Drake lines earmarked in the "Stage II" plan, to be rebuilt at a later date as funding became available.  Until such time, the "Stage II" lines would not be able to accommodate the new, heavier, and wider rail cars due to their age and condition, so the Authority needed to continue to operate their aging PCC fleet.

The solution was a fleet of completely rebuilt PCC's that could complement the new LRVs by operating on portions of the system that could not yet accommodate the larger, heavier cars, as well as having new components that extended their service lives until such time that their lines could be rebuilt and replacements bought.

Originally, the Authority planned to overhaul forty-five of their 1700-series PCC's.  However, budgetary constraints and technical difficulties resulted in only sixteen cars being rebuilt. Of the sixteen, only twelve cars received the complete overhaul, while four were only partially rebuilt.  These four, affectionately referred to as "Super 17's" by many, received the same mechanical and electrical improvements, seats, body work, and paint scheme as the remaining twelve, but retained several of their 1949 attributes, including original interior and exterior lighting, all-steel body panels, and operator's controls, as well as retaining their original numbers.   The 4000-series cars that received the complete overhaul were essentially completely new vehicles built within the old car's body.  All new propulsion and braking systems had been installed, as well as new interiors with improved lighting. Some cars were given two pantographs, where the front one was outfitted with a de-icing apparatus intended to help remove sleet from the overhead wires.  As planned, nearly all cars would be air-conditioned, but with the aforementioned budget issues, only one car, number 4006, was fitted with an air-conditioning system.

Service

The 4000 series was intended as an interim solution for the Authority's unrebuilt lines, which could not accommodate the newer, heavier railcars.  As such, they were assigned to the 47D Drake via Overbrook,  47L Library via Overbrook, and 47S South Hills Village via Overbrook lines, as well as the 47 Shannon line, all trans-versing the Overbrook corridor.  In 1988, Port Authority retired all of its remaining unrebuilt PCC's due to safety concerns, leaving only the twelve 4000 PCC's and four "Super 17's" available to serve the Overbrook, Library, and Drake lines, thus necessitating the use of LRV's on at least one of these lines to maintain service.  Of the three, the Library line was found to be the best suited to accommodate the larger LRV's with only minor modifications, and the route was modified and redesignated as the "42L Library via Beechview" (as the Overbrook line could not accommodate the LRV's) in December, 1988, and the PCC's were relegated to just the 47D,S, and 47 lines.

Unlike the LRV's which had both high and low level doors, the PCC's had only low level doors and were limited to street level boarding.  As a result, all major stations on portions of the system that were shared by PCC's and LRV's (these being South Hills Village, Washington Junction, Castle Shannon, South Hills Junction, and all stops north of the Mount Washington Transit Tunnel) had both high and low platforms to accommodate both types of cars.

In 1993, the Overbrook Line was shut down between Castle Shannon and South Hills Junction due to the deteriorated conditions of the track, bridges, walls, and other infrastructure.  With that, routes 47 and 47S were suspended, and the 47D was reduced to a short shuttle between Drake and Castle Shannon, where riders would be required to transfer to route 42S, 42L, or a bus to continue to downtown.

In 1999, the Drake shuttle was shut down, and the remaining PCC's were retired.

Roster

Preserved examples
Car #4004 was donated to the Pennsylvania Trolley Museum where it has become part of a collection of historic streetcars and trolleys from all across the United States and other nations. San Francisco MUNI acquired #4008 and #4009 in an internet auction in 2002 for $5000 each. However, the agency expressed little interest in restoring the cars, as they differed significantly from other MUNI PCCs, and would require re-gauging (as San Francisco cars are Standard Gauge) as well as modifications for ADA accessibility.  By 2018, these factors, combined with the poor condition of the cars, having been stored outdoors for nearly two decades, ultimately prompted Muni to sell the two for scrap, and the cars were cut up the following year.  Muni instead repainted their PCC no. 1062, originally Philadelphia Transportation Company (later SEPTA) no. 2101, in Pittsburgh Railways Company livery to represent the city.  The disposition of the remainder are as follows:

4001: Static display in front of South Hills Village depot.
4002: Undergoing restoration at Pikes Peak Trolley Museum in Colorado Springs
4004: Preserved and in passenger service at the Pennsylvania Trolley Museum in Washington, Pa
4006: Cleveland, Ohio: Private owner, car sits in Dept. of Public Works parking lot near the Detroit-Superior Viaduct.
4011: Buckeye Lake, Ohio: private owner (derelict)
4012 (ex-4000): Buckeye Lake, Ohio: private owner (also derelict)

See also
 Pittsburgh Light Rail
 47 Drake
 PCC streetcars
 SEPTA PCC II
 Siemens SD-400

References

External links
 The Presidents' Conference Committee Cars (the PCCs)
 Port Authority Transit Car #4004
 Pittsburgh Transit History

Port Authority of Allegheny County
600 V DC multiple units
Electric multiple units of the United States